Sushovan Banerjee ( — 26 July 2022), also known as One Rupee Doctor, was an Indian physician and politician. He was known for treating needy people for one rupee. In 1984, he was the MLA of Bolpur. In 2020, he was awarded the Padma Shri by the Indian Government for his contribution in the field of medicine.

Early life
Banerjee was from Bolpur, West Bengal. He did his graduation from R. G. Kar Medical College and Hospital and did his PG degree in Pathology from Calcutta University. Then he moved to London for a diploma in Haematology.

Career
Since 1963 he was treating poor patients for just one rupee. Only during the COVID-19 pandemic he had to shut down his medical clinic for sometimes, otherwise his medical chamber was always open.

In 2020 he held his name in the Guinness World Records for treating the maximum number of patients in a lifetime. In the same year, he was awarded the Padma Shri by the Indian Government for his contribution on the field of medicine. He has also got a gold medal from R. G. Kar Medical College and Hospital.

Personal life
Banerjee died on 26 July 2022, at the age of 84.

Awards
 Gold Medal
 Padma Shri in 2020

References

1930s births
Year of birth missing
2022 deaths
Recipients of the Padma Shri in medicine
University of Calcutta alumni
People from Birbhum district
Medical doctors from Kolkata